Qalaat Faqra is an archaeological site in Kfardebian, Lebanon, with Roman and Byzantine ruins. Located near the Faqra ski resort on the slopes of Mount Sannine at an altitude of 1500 m, it is one of the most important sites of the UNESCO-listed Nahr al-Kalb valley.

The ruins are the most extensive Roman archeological site in Mount Lebanon that consists of columns, altars tombs and temples, including the Claudius Tower with its Greek inscription that states that the building, which at one time was topped with a pyramid-shaped roof like Kamouh el Hermel, was renovated by the Roman emperor Claudius in honor of Adonis in CE 43–44. The tower has a 16m square base.

The site includes a temple to Zeus Beelgalasos, a sanctuary of Atargatis dedicated to Agrippa II and his sister Berenice, and two altars,  built in 44 A.D.

See also
 1st century in Lebanon

References

 

Archaeological sites in Lebanon
Tourist attractions in Lebanon